Francesco Gonzaga, C.R. (1602 – 18 December 1673) was a Roman Catholic prelate who served as Bishop of Nola (1657–1673) and Bishop of Cariati e Cerenzia (1633–1657).

Biography
Francesco Gonzaga was born in 1602 and ordained a priest in the Congregation of Clerics Regular of the Divine Providence. On 21 February 1633, he was appointed during the papacy of Pope Urban VIII as Bishop of Cariati e Cerenzia.
On 24 February 1633, he was consecrated bishop by Antonio Marcello Barberini, Cardinal-Priest of Sant'Onofrio. On 17 December 1657, he was appointed during the papacy of Pope Alexander VII as Bishop of Nola. He served as Bishop of Nola until his death on 18 December 1673.

Episcopal succession
While bishop, he was the principal co-consecrator of:
Fabrizio Savelli, Archbishop of Salerno (1642); and 
Pietro Jerónimo Martínez y Rubio, Archbishop of Palermo (1657).

References

External links and additional sources
 (for Chronology of Bishops) 
 (for Chronology of Bishops) 
 (for Chronology of Bishops) 
 (for Chronology of Bishops) 

17th-century Italian Roman Catholic bishops
Bishops appointed by Pope Urban VIII
Bishops appointed by Pope Alexander VII
1602 births
1673 deaths
Theatine bishops